The 1999 FIA GT Monza 500 km was the opening round the 1999 FIA GT Championship season.  It took place at the Autodromo Nazionale Monza, Italy, on April 11, 1999.  This event was shared with a Sports Racing World Cup round.

Official results
Cars failing to complete 70% of winner's distance are marked as Not Classified (NC).

Statistics
 Pole position – #1 Chrysler Viper Team Oreca – 1:45.344
 Fastest lap – #1 Chrysler Viper Team Oreca – 1:46.278
 Average speed – 185.704 km/h

References

 
 

M
FIA GT Monza